Bongonoko is a settlement in Kenya's Tana River County.

References 

Populated places in Tana River County